Comarostaphylis diversifolia, known by the common names summer holly and California comarostaphylos, is a species of shrub in the heath family.

It is native to Southern California and northern Baja California, where it grows in coastal chaparral habitat.

Description
Comarostaphylis diversifolia  is an erect shrub which can exceed  in height. Its bark is gray and shreddy and the tough, evergreen leaves are oval in shape and sometimes toothed.

The inflorescence is a raceme of urn-shaped flowers very similar to those of the related shrubs, the manzanitas. The fruit is a bright red, juicy drupe with a bumpy skin.

Subspecies
There are two subspecies:
Comarostaphylis diversifolia ssp. diversifolia - native to the coastal hills of Southern California and Baja California.
Comarostaphylis diversifolia ssp. planifolia - native to the Channel Islands of California and the Transverse Ranges north of Los Angeles.

See also
California chaparral and woodlands
California coastal sage and chaparral

References

External links

Jepson Manual Treatment: Comarostaphylis diversifolia
USDA Plants Profile
Comarostaphylis diversifolia — U.C. Photo gallery

Arbutoideae
Flora of California
Flora of Baja California
Natural history of the California chaparral and woodlands
Natural history of the Channel Islands of California
Natural history of the Peninsular Ranges
Natural history of the Santa Monica Mountains
Natural history of the Transverse Ranges
Garden plants of North America
Drought-tolerant plants
Flora without expected TNC conservation status